Sprite Zero Sugar (also known as Diet Sprite or Sprite No Sugar, and known as simply Sprite in the Netherlands and Ireland) is a colorless, lemon-lime soft drink produced by The Coca-Cola Company. It is a sugar-free variant of Sprite, and is one of the drinks in Coca-Cola's "Zero Sugar" lineup.

History
Sprite Zero Sugar originally began production as "Sugar Free Sprite" in 1974, and was renamed to "Diet Sprite" in 1983. In other countries, it was known as "Sprite Light". The brand "Sprite Zero" was first used in Greece in 2002. Beginning in 2002, the name was changed almost worldwide to Sprite Zero, matching The Coca-Cola Company's launch of Fanta Zero and Coca-Cola Zero. In 2019, the drink was re-branded as "Sprite Zero Sugar" in order to align with the Coca-Cola Company's 2017 re-brand of Coca-Cola Zero as "Coca-Cola Zero Sugar" and its 2019 extension of that branding to its zero-calorie varieties of Coca-Cola Vanilla and Coca-Cola Cherry.

Ingredients
The following ingredients are listed here: carbonated water, citric acid, natural flavors, potassium citrate, and potassium benzoate, aspartame, and acesulfame potassium. (Aspartame contains phenylalanine.)

Varieties

Nutrition 
Comparing Sprite Zero Sugar to other popular lemon-lime sodas.

See also
 Sprite (drink)
 Coca-Cola
 Soft drink

References

External links
Sprite official website

Diet drinks
Lemon-lime sodas
Coca-Cola brands
Products introduced in 1974